Mario Branch (August 13, 1979 – April 8, 2011) was an American football offensive tackle. He was signed by the Tennessee Titans as an undrafted free agent in 2003, but did not make the team in two seasons. He was allocated to NFL Europe in 2004 to play for the Amsterdam Admirals. He played for the Philadelphia Soul in 2005 and for the Nashville Storm in 2007. He played college football at Mississippi Valley State. He died due to congestive heart failure in April 2011 at the age of 31.

References

External links
Stats at ArenaFan.com

1979 births
2011 deaths
Players of American football from Mississippi
American football offensive tackles
Tennessee Titans players
Amsterdam Admirals players
Philadelphia Soul players
People from Greenwood, Mississippi